Disagree and commit is a management principle which states that individuals are allowed to disagree while a decision is being made, but that once a decision has been made, everybody must commit to it. The principle can also be understood as a statement about when it is useful to have conflict and disagreement, with the principle saying disagreement is useful in early states of decision-making while harmful after a decision has been made. Disagree and commit is a method of avoiding the consensus trap, in which the lack of consensus leads to inaction.

History
Scott McNealy used the phrase as early as some time between 1983 and 1991, as part of the line "Agree and commit, disagree and commit, or get out of the way".

The concept has also been attributed to Andrew Grove at Intel.

Amazon added "Have Backbone; Disagree and Commit" as one of its leadership principles some time in 2010–2011. Amazon CEO Jeff Bezos mentioned the term in his "2016 Letter to Shareholders".

Organizations that have used the principle
 Sun Microsystems
 Intel
 Amazon.com
 Netflix
 GitLab
 Chef Software
 Qatar Airways
 Zalando
 Autodesk
 Nubank
 Camunda

Reception
Noted difficulties of applying "disagree and commit" are:

 It can be difficult to disagree with more powerful or senior individuals
 There can be dissonance in committing to something while being unconvinced of it

See also
 Democratic centralism
 Management science
 Management style
 Outline of business management

References

Management